Phaegoptera depicta is a moth of the family Erebidae. It was described by Gottlieb August Wilhelm Herrich-Schäffer in 1855. It is found in southern Brazil.

References

Phaegoptera
Moths described in 1855